Puffin Island is a rocky islet in the Kotzebue Sound, Alaska.

This island is located  NW of Chamisso Island,  . SW of Selawik, Kotzebue-Kobuk Low. Puffin Island is a steep rock and, though much smaller than Chamisso Island, it has many more nesting birds on its surface, especially horned puffins. Both islands are part of the Chamisso Wilderness in the Chukchi Sea unit of the Alaska Maritime National Wildlife Refuge.

This island was named in 1826 by Captain Frederick William Beechey (1831, p. 255), RN. He wrote, "Detached from Chamisso there is a steep rock which by way of distinction we named Puffin Island."

Puffin Island has been a Natural Reserve since December 7, 1912. The protected area (Chamisso Wilderness) includes Chamisso Island and Puffin Island, as well as some rocky islets nearby.

See also 
 List of islands of Alaska

References

External links
GNIS listing

Islands of Alaska
Seabird colonies
Islands of Northwest Arctic Borough, Alaska
Islands of the Chukchi Sea
Alaska Maritime National Wildlife Refuge
Protected areas of Northwest Arctic Borough, Alaska